Nationalities Papers is a peer-reviewed academic journal published by Cambridge University Press for the Association for the Study of Nationalities. The editor-in-chief is Harris Mylonas (George Washington University). It publishes articles on nationalism, minorities, and ethnic conflict, with a regional focus on Central and Eastern Europe, the Balkans, the former Soviet Union, Turkey, and Central Asia. The journal is interdisciplinary, with authors from a variety of backgrounds, including history, political science, sociology, anthropology, and literature. Nationalities Papers started in 1972 and currently publishes 6 issues per year.

Abstracting and indexing 
Nationalities Papers is abstracted and indexed in International Bibliography of the Social Sciences, Scopus and the Social Sciences Citation Index.

According to the Journal Citation Reports, the journal has a 2018 impact factor of 0.803, ranking it 37 out of 74 in Area Studies, 130 out of 176 in Political Science 16 out of 95 in History.

References

External links 
 
 Association for the Study of Nationalities

Political science journals
Area studies journals
Publications established in 1972
Bimonthly journals
English-language journals
Taylor & Francis academic journals
Cambridge University Press academic journals